Eclipse of the Sun (Spanish:Eclipse de sol) is a 1943 Argentine film directed by Luis Saslavsky.

Cast
Libertad Lamarque 		
George Rigaud 	
Angelina Pagano

External links
 

1943 films
1940s Spanish-language films
Argentine black-and-white films
Films directed by Luis Saslavsky
Argentine comedy films
1943 comedy films
1940s Argentine films